is a passenger railway station located in the town of Shimanto, Takaoka District, Kōchi Prefecture, Japan. It is operated by JR Shikoku and has the station number "K25".

Lines

Layout
Niida Station, which is unstaffed, consists of a side platform serving a single track. A station building is located slightly away from the platform and serves as a waiting room. A ramp leads from the building to the platform. The platform was originally an island format serving two tracks but one track has been removed.

History
With the privatization of JNR on 1 April 1987, control of the station passed to JR Shikoku.

Surrounding area
Shimanto Town Niida Elementary School
Japan National Route 56

See also
 List of railway stations in Japan

References

External links
Station timetable

Railway stations in Kōchi Prefecture
Railway stations in Japan opened in 1951
Shimanto, Kōchi (town)